Depressaria albipunctella is a moth of the family Depressariidae. It is found in most of Europe, as well as in Libya.

The wingspan is 19–22 mm. Adults are on wing from early August to late November and after hibernating again from March to May in one generation per year.

The larvae feed on Daucus, Conium, Torilis, Anthriscus, Chaerophyllum, Pimpinella and Seseli species. They live in a loose upper-surface silk spinning of a leaf of their host plant.

References

External links
lepiforum.de

Moths described in 1775
Depressaria
Moths of Europe
Moths of Africa